Anderson Andrade Antunes (born 15 November 1981) is a Brazilian footballer who currently plays as a striker for AD Carmelita.

Club career 
After a short stint playing professionally in Mexico, and a subsequent four-year stint in his native Brazil, Anderson Andrade joined Japanese club Mito HollyHock for the 2006 J2 league season. He developed quickly into a fan favorite as he became one of the highest scorers in the division, placing 7th, with the best goal-per-shot ratio in Japanese professional soccer.

Following the conclusion of the 2006 season, he announced on 20 December that he would like to return to play soccer in Brazil for 2007. However, in January 2007, he was signed by Sagan Tosu.  After seeing only limited matchplay for the first six months of his contract, on 16 June 2007, he joined Shimizu S-Pulse on loan.  The move to Shizuoka was ultimately unsuccessful, and he joined J2 League team Yokohama FC for the 2008 season. The shift to Yokohama proved to be a more productive move than his previous two clubs, and he averaged a goal every two games.

Completing his Japanese contract, Anderson Andrade returned to Brazil in the summer of 2009, joining the team of Rio Branco de Andradas.

On 5 July 2009, Egyptian Premier League club El Zamalek officially announced the signing of a 3-year contract with Anderson.  However, El Zamalek later canceled the deal without Anderson Andrade ever stepping foot on the football pitch in a competitive match for the club.  The cancellation was put down to Anderson Andrade's lack of condition, as he apparently did not appear in good shape to play.  In September 2009, Anderson moved to Brujas FC of Costa Rica, where he would score eight goals in nine league matches.

Anderson Andrade has since moved to K-League club Daegu FC, in South Korea. He scored his first goal for them on 28 March, in a 2-1 win over Daejeon Citizen, and went on to play eight league matches, as well as three league cup appearances for the Korean club, before returning his former club Brujas FC during the K-League midseason summer break.

On 2 February 2010, Valletta F.C., a Maltese Premier League team, presented the player as their new purchase, with a contract until the end of the season.

In July 2011, he returned to Costa Rica to join C.S. Herediano.
In July 2014, he transferred to Roasso Kumamoto.

Club statistics
Updated to 23 February 2016.

References

External links
 Profile at Roasso Kumamoto

 
 

1981 births
Living people
Brazilian footballers
Brazilian expatriate footballers
Campinense Clube players
Ferroviário Atlético Clube (CE) players
Fortaleza Esporte Clube players
Grêmio Barueri Futebol players
Mito HollyHock players
Sagan Tosu players
Shimizu S-Pulse players
Yokohama FC players
Roasso Kumamoto players
C.S. Herediano footballers
Liga FPD players
J1 League players
J2 League players
Daegu FC players
L.D. Alajuelense footballers
Valletta F.C. players
K League 1 players
Expatriate footballers in Costa Rica
Expatriate footballers in Guatemala
Brazilian expatriate sportspeople in Guatemala
Expatriate footballers in Japan
Brazilian expatriate sportspeople in Japan
Expatriate footballers in South Korea
Brazilian expatriate sportspeople in South Korea
Expatriate footballers in Malta
Expatriate footballers in Egypt
Association football forwards
People from Ibitinga